Dendrobium malbrownii, commonly known as the McIlwraith hermit orchid, is an epiphytic or lithophytic orchid in the family Orchidaceae and is endemic to tropical North Queensland, Australia. It has thin, wiry, crowded stems each with narrow, dark green leaves and a single shiny, cream-coloured flower with a purple labellum. It grows on trees, fallen logs and rocks in rainforest on the McIlwraith Range.

Description 
Flowering occurs between December and April.

Taxonomy and naming
Dendrobium malbrownii  was first formally described in 1967 by Alick Dockrill in Australian Plants. The specific epithet (malbrownii) honours Malcolm Brown, the collector of the type specimen.

Distribution and habitat
The McIlwraith hermit orchid grows on small rocks, logs and trees in rainforest in the McIlwraith Range in tropical North Queensland.

References

malbrownii
Orchids of Queensland
Plants described in 1967